The given name Griffith may refer to:

 Griffith Bodwrda (1621–1677), Welsh politician and Member of Parliament
 Griffith Borgeson (1918–1997), American race car historian and editor-in-chief of Motor Trend magazine
 Griffith Brewer, pioneer English balloonist and aviator
 Griffith Buck (1915–1991), horticulturalist and professor of horticulture
 Griffith Davies (1788–1855), actuary
 Griffith Edwards, British psychiatrist and researcher
 Griffith Evans (politician) (1869–1943), Australian politician
 Griffith C. Evans (1887–1973), American mathematician
 Griffith Griffith (1883–1967), Welsh Presbyterian minister
 Griffith J. Griffith (1850–1919), Welsh-American industrialist and philanthropist
 Griffith Hughes (fl. 1707–1758), naturalist and author
 Griffith John (1831–1912), Welsh missionary to China and a pioneer evangelist
 Griffith Jones (disambiguation)
 Griffith Lloyd (died 1586), Principal of Jesus College, Oxford
 Griffith Powell (1561–1620), philosopher and Principal of Jesus College, Oxford
 Griffith Roberts (1845–1943), Anglican priest and author
 Griffith Rutherford (c. 1721 – 1805), American Revolutionary War officer and politician
 Griffith Thomas (1820–1879), American architect
 Griffith Williams (bishop) (1589?-1672), Anglican bishop of Ossory, Ireland